Kamak-e Sofla (also Romanized as Kamak-e Soflá; also known as Kamak and Kamak-e Pā’īn) is a village in Chaharduli Rural District, in the Central District of Asadabad County, Hamadan Province, Iran. At the 2006 census, its population was 898, in 223 families.

References 

Populated places in Asadabad County